The 2023 Extreme E Championship is the third season of the Extreme E electric off-road racing series.

Calendar
On 16 November 2022, the 2023 season calendar was announced:

Race format
The weekend format was tweaked again prior to the start of season three. All events will now be double-headers, with one full round taking place on Saturday and another on Sunday. Qualifying was also updated, with time trials dropped in favour of five-car races: each of the two qualifying sessions will consist of two heats. With the aim of condensing the schedule into a single day, the race format that included a pair of semi-finals, a "crazy race" and a final was discontinued. It is now the combined qualifying results that determine what team advances where, with the top five qualifiers progressing to the grand final and the bottom five to the new "redemption race". This means that qualifying now limits how many championship points an entrant can score: a team qualifying in positions one to five can be classified fifth at worst, while a team qualifying sixth or lower can only aspire to sixth at best. The points system remained largely unchanged—the only variations being a reduction from 5 to 2 points for the fastest Super Sector, and the introduction of 1 point for the winner of a qualifying heat.

Teams and drivers
The following teams and drivers are currently contracted to compete in the 2023 Championship. All teams use one of the identical Odyssey 21 electric SUVs manufactured by Spark Racing Technology, with ABT Cupra XE and Chip Ganassi Racing running modified bodyworks. Each team consists of a male and a female driver, who share a car and have equal driving duties.

 A new team called XE Sports Group was scheduled to enter the series, but deferred its entry to 2024.

Results and standings

X-Prix

Scoring system
Points are awarded to the top ten finishers. An additional 2 points are given to the fastest team in the Super Sector over the whole weekend. Starting from this season, the winning team and drivers in each qualifying heat get 1 extra point.

Drivers' Championship standings

Teams' Championship standings

Notes

References

Extreme E seasons
Extreme E
Extreme_E_Championship